This is a list of Brazilian films scheduled for theater release in 2014.

See also
2014 in Brazil
2014 in Brazilian television

External links
 Calendário de estreias nacionais 2014 Completo at the FilmeB

2014
Lists of 2014 films by country or language
Films